Patrick J. Fitzelle (born 1957) is an Irish former hurler.  At club level he played with Cashel King Cormacs and was also a member of the Tipperary senior hurling team. He usually lined out as a half-back or at midfield.

Career

Fitzelle first played at juvenile and underage levels with the Cashel King Cormacs club before joining the club's senior team. He won numerous West Tipperary Championship titles across three decades, before winning a Munster Club Championship title in 1991. Fitzelle first appeared on the inter-county scene during a two-year stint with the Tipperary minor team. He progressed onto the Tipperary under-21 team and lined out in the 1978 All-Ireland final defeat by Galway. By this stage Fitzelle had already been drafted onto the Tipperary senior hurling team. He spent more than a decade with the team and won a Munster Championship title in 1987.

Honours

Cashel King Cormacs
Munster Senior Club Hurling Championship: 1991
Tipperary Senior Hurling Championship: 1991
West Tipperary Senior Hurling Championship: 1975, 1976, 1980, 1988, 1990, 1991

Tipperary
Munster Senior Hurling Championship: 1987
National Hurling League: 1978-79
Munster Under-21 Hurling Championship: 1978

References

External link

 Pat Fitzelle profile on Tipp GAA Archives website

1957 births
Living people
Cashel King Cormac's hurlers
Tipperary inter-county hurlers
Tipperary inter-county Gaelic footballers
Munster inter-provincial hurlers